The Women's National Collegiate Athletic Association (WNCAA) is an athletic association in the Philippines exclusively for women. It was founded in 1970. Competition is divided into three divisions: Seniors for college students, Juniors for high school students, and Midgets for grade school and first year high school students. Its men's counterpart is the Men's National Collegiate Athletic Association, founded in 2004.

Sports
Basketball
Volleyball
Futsal
Taekwondo
Badminton
Swimming
Table Tennis
Softball
Cheerdance

Member schools

Metro Manila
Assumption Antipolo
Assumption College San Lorenzo - AC Titans
Centro Escolar University - CEU Scorpions
Chiang Kai Shek College - CKSC Blue Dragons
De La Salle-Santiago Zobel School - DLSZ Lady Junior Archers
La Salle College Antipolo - LSCA Voyagers
Miriam College - Maria Katipuneras
Philippine Women's University - PWU Patriots
San Beda College Alabang - San Beda Alabang Red Lionesses
St. Paul College Pasig
St. Scholastica's College - St. Scholastica's Scions
Saint Jude Catholic School - St. Jude
St. Stephen's High School - Stephenians
University of Asia and the Pacific - UA&P Dragons
University of Makati - UMak Herons
On Leave
De La Salle-College of Saint Benilde - CSB St. Benilde Blazers
Lyceum of the Philippines University - LPU Lady Pirates
Angelicum College - Angelicum Roebucks
La Consolacion College - La Consolacion Blue Royals
Emilio Aguinaldo College - EAC Generals
Rizal Technological University - RTU Lady Thunder
St. Pedro Poveda College  - Poveda Phoenix
Former members
AMA Computer University - AMACU Titans
Siena College of Quezon City - Siena Crimson Bravehearts
Saint Francis of Assisi College System - St. Francis Lady Doves (Failed the requirements of WNCAA)
 World Citi Colleges - WCC Vikings

Cordillera Administrative Region
Baguio Central University BCU Lady Eagles
 Baguio Colleges Foundation BCF
Benguet State University BSU
 Cordillera Career Development College CCDC Lady Admirals
 Pines City College PCC
STI Colleges, Baguio STI Olympians
St. Louis University (Baguio) SLU Lady Navigators
University of Baguio UB Lady Cardinals
University of the Cordilleras UC Lady Jaguars
University of the Philippines Baguio UPB Lady Fighting Maroons

Central Luzon
Bulacan State University BulSU Lady Gold Gears
Holy Angel University Lady Flyers
Lyceum of Subic Bay Sharks
St. Scholastica's Academy - San Fernando
Tarlac State University Lady Tigers
University of the Assumption UA Lady Blue Pelicans

CALABARZON
Batangas State University BatSU
Cavite State University CavSU Lady Hornets
De La Salle Lipa DLSL Lady Chevrons
Laguna College of Business and Arts LCBA Lady Lycans
University of Perpetual Help System Laguna UPHSL Saints
University of the Philippines Los Baños UPLB Lady Fighting Maroons

Bicol Region
University of Santo Tomas–Legazpi, Legazpi City, USTL Lady Phoenix
Ateneo de Naga University ADNU Lady Golden Knights
Bicol University, Legazpi City, BU
Divine Word College of Legazpi DWCL
Universidad de Sta. Isabel, Naga City, USI Vicentians
University of Nueva Caceres UNC Greyhounds

Visayas
 Colegio de Sta. Catalina de Alexandria COSCA
Foundation University FU Lady Greywolves
Holy Name University HNU Lady Falcons
Negros Oriental State University NORSU Lady Tigers
Silliman University SU Mares
St. Paul University Dumaguete SPUD Saints

References

External links

Student sport in the Philippines